The 2014 Wyoming Cowboys football team represented the University of Wyoming in the 2014 NCAA Division I FBS football season. The Cowboys were led by first year head coach Craig Bohl and played their home games at War Memorial Stadium. They were members of the Mountain Division of the Mountain West Conference. They finished the season 4–8, 2–6 in Mountain West play to finish in a tie for fifth place in the Mountain Division.

Schedule

Schedule Source:

Personnel

Coaching staff

Roster

Box Scores

Montana

Air Force

at #2 Oregon

Florida Atlantic

at Michigan State

at Hawaii

San Jose State

at Colorado State

at Fresno State

Utah State

Boise State

at New Mexico

Statistics

Team

Offense

Defense

Key: SOLO: Solo Tackles, AST: Assisted Tackles, TOT: Total Tackles, TFL: Tackles-for-loss, SACK: Quarterback Sacks, INT: Interceptions, BU: Passes Broken Up, QBH: Quarterback Hits, FF: Forced Fumbles, FR: Fumbles Recovered, BLK: Kicks or Punts Blocked, SAF: Safeties

Special teams

Scores by quarter (all opponents)

References

Wyoming
Wyoming Cowboys football seasons
Wyoming Cowboys football